Chagrin Valley Little Theatre is a community theater located in Chagrin Falls, Ohio in the United States.  The theater has been in existence since 1930, and is one of the oldest community theaters in the country (the oldest being the Little Theatre of Wilkes-Barre, founded 8 years earlier).

The main CVLT facility includes a main auditorium seating 262 patrons, two group dressing rooms, a small scene shop, and lobby.  The second story of the building is known as The River Room, and hosts events before and after performances.

Adjacent to CVLT's main building is The Riverstreet Playhouse, which is a smaller Black box theater-like space affiliated with, but not owned by, Chagrin Valley Little Theatre.

CVLT's annual season begins in September, and includes approximately eight major productions, including up to three musical theater productions.  The season also includes performances by the active Youth Theatre, and special events such as the annual Murder By The Falls fundraiser.

History 

CVLT has come a long way from its humble beginnings in 1930. In that year, Chagrin Falls was a sleepy little town with little in the way of culture. Alfred Hill, owner of a short-lived newspaper in the Valley, ran an article in his paper suggesting that interested residents meet and form a local group of players.

The idea caught on, and in November 1930 the Valley Players celebrated their inaugural season with a series of three one-act plays staged in the Federated Church gym. So successful was the first production that 50 more people joined the Players, and plans were laid for a second season.

The Players opened their second season on the upper floor of the Old Town Hall, which was to be their home until a fire destroyed the second story in 1943. For the next several years the Players used makeshift accommodations in schools and other buildings.

In the fall of 1948, following two fundraising drives, construction was begun on the present Little Theatre building on River Street. Architect Frank Draz, who also designed the Cleveland Play House and Karamu Theater, drew the final plans for the theater.

The new facility opened in November 1949 with the world premiere of How’s Your Hooper, by Everett Rhodes Castle of Cleveland heights. Going to the theater became the social thing to do in the Valley.

The theater thrived and rapidly expanded its offerings to include a youth theater group and a ballet school. For many years the theater actors and audiences were limited to Valley residents only. By the late 1960s, as television and movies drew people away from live theater, the Chagrin Valley Little Theatre decided to open its doors to the wider community.

Notable Actors
Notable actors who have appeared on the CVLT stage include:
Tim Conway (Comedic Actor)
Howard Da Silva (Stage and Screen Actor)

External links
Chagrin Valley Little Theatre website

Community theatre
Tourist attractions in Cuyahoga County, Ohio
Theatre companies in Ohio
Theatres in Ohio
Buildings and structures in Cuyahoga County, Ohio